Places named Littleborough in England are:

 Littleborough, Devon, a location
 Littleborough, Greater Manchester
 Littleborough, Nottinghamshire: south of Gainsborough